CFJU-FM is a Canadian radio station, broadcasting at 90.1 FM in Kedgwick, New Brunswick. The station broadcasts a French-language community radio format.

The station was originally launched in 1991 as a rebroadcaster of CFAI in Edmundston. Although the station still rebroadcasts some programming from CFAI, it began airing locally produced programming in 1993.

The station is a member of the Alliance des radios communautaires du Canada.

References

External links
FM 90
 
 

FJU
FJU
FJU
Radio stations established in 1991
1991 establishments in New Brunswick